OCN (オーシーエヌ), or Open Computer Network(オープン・コンピュータ・ネットワーク:Ōpun Konpyūta nettowāku), is the largest Japanese Internet service provider, with over 7 million subscribers. It is owned by NTT Communications Corp, one of the largest telecommunication companies in the world. It offers dial-up and ISDN, DSL up to 50 Mbit/s and fiber up to 200 Mbit/s download and 100Mbit/s upload.

As a result of regulations intended to promote competition, OCN themselves offer only internet service (routing); the physical line can be offered by NTT (the parent corporation), or by another company. Speeds up to 1Gbit/s are offered in Western Japan, while in East Japan only 200Mbit/s is officially offered for residential use, even though the underlying fiber infrastructure is capable of 1Gbit/s.

OCN also offers an MVNO mobile broadband service called "OCN Mobile One", based on NTT Docomo's LTE infrastructure. Initially it started out as a data-only service, but more recently OCN Mobile One also offers an onseikake SIM card (音声対応SIMカード) that provides full service (data, SMS and voice) without requiring any calling app.

See also
 Verio

References

External links
 Official OCN website
 Start of OCN Business Web Service and its Future at Science Links Japan
 NTT communications
 OCN known as ocn.ad.jp is also the source of a large number of phishing spam emails and Malware distribution activity
 Discussion regarding ocn.ne.jp as a source of spam/malware

Internet service providers of Japan
NTT Communications